The Noire River (French: Rivière Noire) flows in the municipality of rivière-à-Pierre, Saint-Alban and Saint-Casimir, in the Portneuf Regional County Municipality, in the administrative region of Capitale-Nationale, in Quebec, in Canada.

Forestry is the main economic activity in the sector; agriculture, second; recreational tourism activities, third.

The surface of the Black River (except the rapids areas) is generally frozen from the beginning of December to the end of March, but the safe circulation on the ice is generally made from the end of December to the beginning of March.

Geography 
Noire River (Portneuf) originates at lac Grandbois which is located east of the village of Rivière-à-Pierre.

 Course in Rivière-à-Pierre 
From Lac Grandbois, the Noire river flows south into the forest zone, crossing Lac du Sauvage, Lac à la Montre, collecting Giguère stream and crossing Montauban Lake.

It flows through "Lac Long" (Long Lake) in the Portneuf Regional Natural Park (Portneuf Nature Regional Park). It spans in the ranks: F, E, VII, VI and V Saint-Alban.

This river flows first to the South-East in forest land in row III and IV. Across the row II, the river veers to the east, then south-east. In the row I, the river flows south and then branches off to the south-west in agricultural land. The river flows north of the village of Saint-Alban, in parallel to the Sainte-Anne River in the rank of 7th Concession. Finally, the river enters Saint-Casimir in the ranks of the Black River. Then the river goes towards the south. It receives waters from Blanche River (Noire River) in Saint-Casimir before emptying into the Sainte-Anne River, just above the village.

Main lakes 
Among the three largest lakes in the watershed is found in the Black River basin, namely Montauban Lake, Long Lake and Lake Blanc Lake. There are also several lakes larger than one square kilometer, namely Clair Lake, Carillon Lake and Émeraude Lake.

Land use 
The majority of the river basin is dominated by a forest environment, with the exception of the downstream section is in an agricultural environment.

There are three dams with a large capacity on the course of the river, ie at the exit of Long, Clair and Watch lakes.

Part of the course of the river is part of the Portneuf Regional Natural Park, in particular the sector of Lac Long and Montauban. It also includes a portion of Lac Carillon, and the lakes Sept Îles, Coeur and Anguille. We practiced there among other things canoeing, kayaking, camping, hiking and climbing.

Toponymy 
According to the Commission de toponymie du Québec (Geographical Names Board of Québec), the Bank of place names has 86 names "Rivière Noire" (Black River) for the province of Quebec and several other names including the word "Noir" (Black).

The name "rivière Noire" (Portneuf) was recorded December 5, 1968, at the Bank of place names in Geographical Names Board of Canada

See also 

 Rivière-à-Pierre, Quebec
 Saint-Alban, Quebec
 Saint-Casimir, Quebec
 Saint-Raymond, Quebec, 
 Saint-Léonard-de-Portneuf, Quebec
 Notre-Dame-de-Montauban, Quebec
 Sainte-Christine-d'Auvergne, Quebec
 Saint-Thuribe, Quebec
 Portneuf Regional County Municipality
 Capitale-Nationale
 Sainte-Anne River (Mauricie)
 Blanche River (Noire River)
 Montauban Lake
 Lac Long
 Clair Lake (Sainte-Christine-d'Auvergne)
 Blanche River (Noire River)
 List of rivers of Quebec

References

Bibliography 
 

Rivers of Capitale-Nationale